Malagasyconus is a genus of sea snails, marine gastropod mollusks in the family Conidae.

Habitat
This genus is found in the following habitats:
 Marine

Species
The following species were brought into synonymy:
 Malagasyconus bonfigliolii (Bozzetti, 2010): synonym of Conus (Malagasyconus) bonfigliolii (Bozzetti, 2010) represented as Conus bonfigliolii (Bozzetti, 2010)
 Malagasyconus lozeti (Richard, 1980): synonym of Conus (Malagasyconus) lozeti Richard, 1980 represented as Conus lozeti Richard, 1980

References

 Monnier E. & Tenorio M. (2015). Malagasyconus (Gastropoda: Conidae), a new genus from southern Madagascar. Xenophora Taxonomy. 6: 47-51

Conidae
Gastropod genera